Wyman Wong (born 21 May 1969) is a Cantopop lyricist from Hong Kong. His works are characterised by puns and other word plays, always pushing the boundaries in both style and content. Previously, he worked as a DJ at Commercial Radio Hong Kong. He has acted in films and hosted the Hong Kong version of television show 1 vs 100, and is a fashion columnist, and fashion consultant and designer, notably designing costumes for Eason Chan's Duo concerts.

Filmography
Filmography as actor includes:
 Knock Off (1998)
 The Lion Roars (2002)
 The Mummy, Aged 19 (2002)
 I Love Hong Kong (2011)
 Golden Chicken 3 (2014)
 12 Golden Ducks (2015)
 Sons of the Neon Night (2019)

References

External links
 

Cantopop artists
Hong Kong lyricists
TVB actors
1969 births
Living people